Conradt is a surname. People with this surname include:

Ervin Conradt (1916–2001), American politician in Wisconsin
Jody Conradt (born 1941), American women's basketball coach
Louis Conradt (1950–2006), American district attorney and suspected sexual offender
Uwe Conradt (born 1977), German politician elected mayor of Saarbrücken in 2019